Samuel E. Abbott was an American football coach.  He served as the head football coach at the State Normal School of Colorado—now known as the University of Northern Colorado—in Greeley, Colorado, for one season, from 1905, compiling a record of 0–2–2.

References

Northern Colorado Bears football coaches
Year of birth missing
Year of death missing